Izzat is an Arabic male given name. People with that name include:

 Izzat Darwaza, Palestinian politician and historian
 Izzat Ibrahim al-Douri, Iraqi military commander 
 Izzat Husrieh, Syrian journalist
 Izzat Yousef Al-Maqrif, Libyan political prisoner 
 Izzat Traboulsi, Syrian politician
 Izzat Klychev, People's Artist of the USSR, incumbent member of the Academy of Arts of the USSR and honorary corresponding member of the Russian Academy of Arts.

See also
 Izet, a Bosnian name
 Izzat (disambiguation)
 Izzet, a Turkish name
 Gizzat, a Tatar and Bashkir male first name and surname

References

Arabic masculine given names